Winter Charles Renouf CIE (1868–1954) was a British philatelist who signed the Roll of Distinguished Philatelists in 1921. He was educated at Victoria College, Jersey. He edited the Philatelic Journal of India and was Hon. Vice-President of the Philatelic Society of India. His Indian collection was auctioned by Robson Lowe in 1960.

Publications
 Early Indian Cancellations and Postmarks 1852-84. 1919. (Supplement, 1923)

References

British philatelists
1868 births
1954 deaths
Signatories to the Roll of Distinguished Philatelists